William Bartlett may refer to: 

William B. Bartlett (1830–1911), Wisconsin state assemblyman
William Bartlet (died 1682), religious minister
William Bartlett (footballer) (1878–1939), English footballer who played for Huddersfield Town
William Bartlett (discus thrower) (1896–1946), American discus thrower
William Francis Bartlett (1840–1876), Union major general during the American Civil War
William Henry Bartlett (1809–1854), British artist
William H. C. Bartlett, American military engineer and educator
William P. Bartlett (1829–1917), Wisconsin state assemblyman
William Chauncey Bartlett (1818–1907), American writer
William S. Bartlett Jr., president of the New Hampshire Senate, 1987–1990
Bill Bartlett, member of the 1960s band The Lemon Pipers and 1970s band Ram Jam
Bill Bartlett (footballer) (1915–1967), Australian rules footballer

See also
William Bartlit (1793–1871), New York politician
William Bartlett Dalby (1840–1918), British aural surgeon and otologist
William Bartlett Fletcher Sr. (1862–1957), rear admiral in the United States Navy